Schoenus melanostachys is a species of sedge within the Schoenus or bogrush genus that is endemic to east coast Australia.

Etymology 
The genus Schoenus is named after an ancient Egyptian unit of measure that was based upon tied reeds. Melanostachys is composed of the Greek melano meaning very dark, and stachys meaning spike or catkin from Greek στάχυς.

References

melanostachys